Theresienwiese is an open space in the Munich borough of Ludwigsvorstadt-Isarvorstadt. It serves as the official ground of the Munich Oktoberfest. There, a memorial commemorates the victims of the 1980 Oktoberfest bombing. Bavariaring, an orbital road, provides access to visiting traffic. In the north the towers of the Paulskirche are visible.

History 

The name of the site is derived from the name of Princess Therese of Saxe-Hildburghausen, the wife of Crown Prince Ludwig I. Their wedding took place on a meadow outside the city walls in 1810 ("Wiese" is German for "meadow."), which thereafter was called Theresienwiese. Since then, the Oktoberfest is celebrated every year to commemorate this event. In addition to the Oktoberfest, a spring festival and a winter festival ("Winter Tollwood") take place there as well. Every year in April, one of Germany's largest flea markets is also held there.

Location 

The site is located south west of the city centre.  It has its own station on the Munich U-Bahn system, on the U4 and U5 lines; the Poccistraße and Goetheplatz stations can be found near the southern end. The nearest Munich S-Bahn station is Hackerbrücke or München Hauptbahnhof (Munich central station).

References 
 

Parks and open spaces in Munich